Peter Machin (born 30 August 1973) is an Australian professional darts player who currently plays for the Professional Darts Corporation (PDC) tournaments.

Career
Australian Machin started to play darts when he was ten years old - his father Brian is a darts player. When 14 Peter for the first time played on stage in the inaugural Australian Youth Masters and reached the final. 2001 he for the first time played as a senior for South Australia. 2008 he for the first time was nominated for the national team and took part in the WDF Asia-Pacific Cup. He won the singles and was part of the winning Australian team.

Since 2011 Machin is a permanent member of the national team and took part in several World Cups. 2015 he won the Pacific Masters and the Australian Grand Masters. 2016 he took part in the BDO World Trophy and reached the final where he lost to Darryl Fitton. In 2017 he again reached the final at the BDO World Trophy. This time he won the title by beating Martin Phillips in the final.

Personal life
In 2014 Machin trained to be a darts coach. Peter's wife Debbie is a successful darts player as well.

World Championship results

WDF
 2023:

External links

1973 births
Australian darts players
Living people
British Darts Organisation players
Professional Darts Corporation associate players
Sportspeople from Adelaide